The McLaren M7A and its M7B, M7C and M7D variants were Formula One racing cars, built by McLaren and used in the world championship between 1968 and 1971. After two relatively unsuccessful years of Formula One competition, the M7A was used to score McLaren's first win at the 1968 Belgian Grand Prix.

Designed by Robin Herd and Gordon Coppuck, the M7A was the first McLaren to be powered by the Cosworth DFV engine, which went on to be used by the team until 1983. The M7B had outboard fuel tanks and the M7C a modified chassis, whilst the M7D was powered by an Alfa-Romeo engine.

The M7A made its Grand Prix debut at the second race of the 1968 world championship. After its victory in Belgium, it took another two wins that year, helping to place McLaren second in the Constructors' Championship.

Background

Bruce McLaren Motor Racing was founded in 1963; Bruce McLaren was a factory driver for the Cooper motor racing team which competed in Formula One, the highest level of international single-seater competition. Since 1966, McLaren and his team had been building and racing their own Formula One cars. Their first two seasons had been relatively unsuccessful, with six points scored (out of a potential 180) and a best result of fourth. The lack of a suitable engine caused problems: the 1966 M2B car's Ford and Serenissima V8 engines both lacked power and the 1967 M5A's British Racing Motors V12 did not arrive until mid-season.

In 1967 Cosworth debuted their DFV engine which was supplied exclusively to the Lotus team. It was immediately successful, winning its first race, and for 1968 it became available for purchase by any manufacturer. McLaren bought five DFV engines at a cost of 7,500 pounds sterling each. Designer Robin Herd was recruited to the team in 1965 before which he had been an aerospace engineer at the National Gas Turbine Establishment (NGTE) where he worked on the Concorde project. His assistant Gordon Coppuck was another ex-NGTE employee. Herd began the design of the M7A towards the end of 1967 but left to join Cosworth before its completion, leaving Coppuck and Bruce McLaren to complete the work.

Design

The M7A was an open-wheeled single-seater with a mid-mounted engine driving the rear wheels. The chassis was a bathtub-type (i.e. open-topped) monocoque made from 22-gauge aluminium alloy and 20-gauge magnesium alloy panels glued and riveted together and to three steel bulkheads. The monocoque terminated behind the driver's seat and the engine was used as a stressed part of the chassis, bolted directly to the rearmost bulkhead. The gearbox was then attached behind the engine, and the rear suspension – consisting of lateral top links, twin radius arms and reversed wishbones– attached to the gearbox and the rear bulkhead. The front suspension – upper and lower lateral links and radius arms – and the steering column were attached to the two bulkheads in front of the driver. Coilover springs and Koni dampers mounted outside of the body were employed front and rear.

The outer bodywork was mostly formed by the monocoque, except for the nose and cockpit which were covered by glass-reinforced plastic (GRP) panels; the engine sometimes also had a GRP cover. McLaren's own magnesium alloy wheels were used; they were  diameter at the rear and 15- or sometimes  diameter at the front.

Fuel was stored in tanks running down the side of the chassis, above the driver's legs and behind their seat, totalling  capacity. Full capacity was not required for most races so the tank above the driver's legs was usually almost empty. For the M7A's first two world championship races, Bruce McLaren's car was fitted with outboard "pannier" fuel tanks at the side of the cockpit. McLaren had a theory that sports racing cars' handling was superior to that of single-seaters because of the weight distribution of their fuel; the pannier tanks were an attempt to replicate this. According to McLaren mechanic Tyler Alexander this idea was developed in discussion with Lotus boss Colin Chapman. After the car was damaged at the 1968 Monaco Grand Prix, it was rebuilt without the pannier tanks.

The  disc brakes were unusual both in being made by Lockheed when most British Formula One teams used Girling brakes, and in being ventilated. Ventilated discs – which have a hollow area between the two outer disc surfaces to aid cooling – had been tried by Lotus who had suffered from cracking problems caused by rapid heating and cooling. The McLaren team hoped that by being mounted well within the wheels, their discs would retain a more constant temperature.

During the 1968 season, wings – which press the car and tyres towards the ground thereby increasing cornering speeds and reducing braking distances – first appeared on Formula One cars in races. Teams experimented with various wing set-ups and the governing body of the sport, the CSI, regulated their use. McLaren had first experimented with wings on their 1965 M2A Formula One development car but didn't use them on the following season's racing car, the M2B. The M7A and its variants wore a variety of wing configurations, as described in the racing history section.

The DFV engine, whose development was funded by Ford and which was designed and constructed by Cosworth, was normally aspirated with eight cylinders arranged in a v configuration (i.e. a V8) of 90 degrees. The block was made from aluminium alloy and the cylinder liners from iron. It had four valves per cylinder, actuated by double overhead camshafts. Liquid-cooling was provided by a radiator situated in the nose which vented through ducts in the upper body surface whilst the engine oil was cooled by a radiator mounted on top of the gearbox at the rear. The gearbox was a Hewland DG300.

The works cars were painted in an orange hue known as papaya; it was not a national racing colour, however, the colour would continue to be used on works McLaren cars until Yardley sponsorship was obtained in 1972.

Variants

M7B

The M7B was a one-off conversion of an M7A chassis with the fuel stored low and centrally in integral tanks at the sides of the cockpit. This was another result of Bruce McLaren's theory about improving the car's handling by altering the fuel weight distribution. Author and former McLaren secretary Eoin Young said that another purpose of the outboard tanks was to make room for a four-wheel-drive system.

M7C

The chief distinguishing characteristic of M7C was its fully enclosed monocoque which gave greater torsional rigidity than the bathtub chassis. It was based on McLaren's M10A Formula 5000 car, which itself was derived from the M7A. One was made.

M7D

The M7D was commissioned by Alfa Romeo's Autodelta competition department and was powered by a 3.0 litre V8 engine from Alfa Romeo's T33 sports car. One was made, although it is unclear whether this was a new chassis or a rebuilding of the M7B chassis.

Racing history

For the 1968 Formula One season, after two years of driving the team's sole entry, Bruce McLaren was partnered by Denny Hulme. Hulme was world champion with the Brabham team in 1967 and had raced for McLaren that year in Can-Am, a North American sports car racing series. For the first round of the 1968 world championship – the South African Grand Prix, which was held in January, four months before the second round – only Hulme competed, using the M5A to finish fifth. The M7A's first race was the Race of Champions at Brands Hatch, run to Formula One rules but not part of the world championship. There, McLaren won from pole position while Hulme was third. Another victory came at the non-championship BRDC International Trophy at Silverstone, this time with Hulme finishing first and McLaren second. In the M7A's championship debut in Spain, Hulme was second and McLaren retired, then in Monaco McLaren crashed and Hulme was fifth and last. At the Belgian Grand Prix, they were fifth and sixth on the grid. Hulme took the lead and held it until a half shaft failed two thirds of the way in. McLaren was then second behind Jackie Stewart's Matra but Stewart had to make a pit stop for fuel on the final lap, giving McLaren the win, although he initially believed he had finished second. It was the McLaren team's first world championship victory and Bruce McLaren became the second driver, after Jack Brabham, to win in a car bearing their own name; it was also the last win of his career.

After Belgium, McLaren's Goodyear tyres suffered a slump in competitiveness and the team and their car fell behind rivals Graham Hill in his Lotus and Stewart in his Matra. At the Dutch Grand Prix McLaren crashed out and Hulme retired with ignition failure. After Lotus had begun the first experimentation with wings in Monaco and Ferrari and Brabham had debuted full height wings in Belgium, McLaren fitted a rear wing to their car for the French Grand Prix. However, mounted above the engine on the sprung mass of the car, it was not as effective as Lotus's wing mounted on the unsprung suspension components. In France Hulme was fourth, then fifth in Britain but both cars were out of the points-earning positions at the German Grand Prix.

An improvement in form came at the Italian Grand Prix where the cars ran without wings and Goodyear brought their new G9 specification tyre. McLaren qualified on the front row and led to begin with until he slowed at the scene of an accident and was caught by Stewart, Hulme and Jo Siffert in a Lotus. A slipstreaming battle ensued; McLaren retired with an oil leak at mid-distance but Hulme went on to win. From the Canadian Grand Prix onwards, a third M7A was driven by Dan Gurney whose Anglo American Racers team – for whom Bruce McLaren had driven for three races in 1967 – had run out of funding for their own Eagle cars. Gurney retired with overheating in Canada, but Hulme and McLaren continued their success by finishing first and second respectively, albeit after their strongest challengers had all retired. Hulme was then jointly in the lead of the Drivers' Championship with two races to go. He ran competitively towards the beginning of the United States Grand Prix but ultimately retired via a spin, pit stops to repair damaged brake lines and a gearbox output shaft failure which spun him again, this time into a crash. McLaren was sixth, Gurney fourth. Going into the final race in Mexico, Hulme retained a chance of defending his title. McLaren finished second there, but Hulme crashed out because of a broken suspension damper allowing Hill to win the Drivers' Championship.

For 1969 McLaren, with an unchanged driver line-up, designed a new four-wheel drive car, the M9A, but whilst that was being readied, continued with the old car. The M9A was eventually unsuccessful and appeared only once, driven by Derek Bell at the British Grand Prix. At the South African Grand Prix Hulme scored a podium with the M7A; Bruce used the M7B version and the pair were joined by Basil van Rooyen in another M7A. In South Africa the works cars used rear wings mounted directly to the suspension on tall struts; at the Race of Champions Bruce McLaren's M7B was fitted with a similarly strutted front wing in the practice session but it was not used in the race. Hulme was third at the Race of Champions and then at International Trophy Bruce McLaren switched to the M7C variant. McLaren qualified 13th on the grid at the Spanish Grand Prix but took advantage of the crashes and breakdowns of those ahead of him to finish second. In the practice sessions at Monaco, high front wings were added to the cars but before the race the CSI banned wings altogether. This left the team to make do with a small "ducktail" rear spoiler, McLaren and Hulme racing to fifth and sixth respectively. Wings were then re-allowed, albeit not mounted on the suspension, and with teams searching for the best solution McLaren initially opted for a "tea tray" rear wing and later a more conventional, low-mounted aerofoil.

Meanwhile, the Colin Crabbe Antique Automobiles team bought the M7B and Vic Elford drove it at the Dutch Grand Prix, finishing 10th. McLaren was fourth, third and third at the French, British and German Grands Prix respectively, but in each Hulme, who qualified on the first row in France and Britain, was sidelined into retirement by mechanical failure. Elford took a best finish of fifth in France but then crashed and destroyed the M7B at the Nürburgring in Germany. The Italian Grand Prix at Monza produced another slipstreaming battle; this time McLaren finished fourth, albeit only 0.19 seconds behind winner Stewart. More unreliability in Canada and the United States restricted the cars to a best finish of fifth before, at the season ending Mexico race Hulme scored the M7's only win of the year.

With McLaren's introduction of the new M14A in 1970, the M7 had only one more works outing when Dan Gurney used an M7A at the 1970 British Grand Prix. Privateer John Surtees bought the M7C as a stopgap until his own Surtees TS7 car was ready. He raced it at four Grands Prix, retiring from three and finishing sixth in the Netherlands. The car then switched hands to Jo Bonnier who used it for two more races that year. The M7D was used intermittently with the M14D by Andrea de Adamich and Nanni Galli, qualifying for and starting only one race, the French Grand Prix where de Adamich finished unclassified. By 1971 the only type's only entrant was Bonnier with his M7C. He used it at five races and had a best result of 10th in the Italian Grand Prix.

World championship results table
(key)

Non-championship results table
(key)

PC simulation
In 2005, a driveable, detailed replica of the McLaren M7B was released as part of the free '69 Mod' for the pc-based racing simulation Grand Prix Legends.

References

Notes

Citations

Bibliography

 
 
 
 
 

McLaren M07A
1968 Formula One season cars
1969 Formula One season cars
1970 Formula One season cars